Amok is the third album by the Finnish metal band Sentenced, released through Century Media in 1995. Though still mostly rooted in the death metal genre, the album takes the melodic death metal direction of 1993's North from Here a step further with elements of traditional heavy metal and doom metal, along with elements of the goth rock-inspired style that the band would take on with subsequent releases, following bassist/vocalist Taneli Jarva's departure.

The lyrics are a mixture of melancholy, mythology and suicidal themes.

An episode of the TV series Home Improvement had the character Mark (played by Taran Noah Smith) wearing a T-shirt that featured the album.

Track listing

Personnel 
Taneli Jarva – vocals, bass, keyboards
Miika Tenkula – guitar, keyboards
Sami Lopakka – guitars, keyboards
Vesa Ranta – drums

Guest musician
Virpi Rautsiala – backing vocals

References 

Sentenced albums
1995 albums
Century Media Records albums